The men's tandem event was part of the track cycling programme at the 1924 Summer Olympics.

The field consisted of 5 pairs of cyclists, each pair from a different country. The Vélodrome de Vincennes track was a  loop.

Results

Source:

Semifinals

The five pairs were divided into three heats, with the French team getting a bye while the other two heats featured two pairs.

 Semifinal 1

 Semifinal 2

 Semifinal 3

Final

The final three pairs competed for the three medals. The French led most of the way, with the Dutch taking a brief lead before veering off. Bosch later explained that Peeters had finished a bottle of cognac before the final.

References

Men's tandem
Cycling at the Summer Olympics – Men's tandem